Canki  is a village in the administrative district of Gmina Ryn, within Giżycko County, Warmian-Masurian Voivodeship, in northern Poland.

Friedrich Baltrusch was born in the village in 1876.

The village has a population of 120.

References

Canki